The Crosby House is a historic house and museum in Tumwater, Washington built  1860 and listed on the National Register of Historic Places. It is part of the Tumwater Historic District.

The house was built by Nathaniel Crosby III and Cordelia Crosby (born Cordelia Jane Smith), grandparents of Bing Crosby.

References

External links

1860 in Washington Territory
Houses in Thurston County, Washington
Museums in Thurston County, Washington
National Register of Historic Places in Thurston County, Washington
Tumwater, Washington